St. Raphael's Syro-Malabar Catholic Cathedral Church or St. Raphael Cathedral is an Eastern Catholic church in Palakkad district, Kerala, India. It is the cathedral church of Syro-Malabar Catholic Diocese of Palghat (Eparchia Palghatensis), created in 1974 through the bull "Apostolico requirente" of Pope Paul VI. The patron of the church is St. Raphael. 

Fr. Joshy Pullikkottil is the current vicar of the church, which is under the pastoral responsibility of Bishop of Palghat, currently Mar Jacob Manathodath.

Religious organisations working under the parish

Thirubalasakyam
CLC
KCYM 
Mathrusangam
Vincent De Paul 
Franciscan 3rd Order

Institutions under the parish
St. Raphael's Cathedral School (CBSE)

Sisters from the parish

Priests from the parish

References

External links

Syro-Malabar Catholic cathedrals
Churches in Palakkad district
Eastern Catholic cathedrals in Kerala
1974 establishments in Kerala
Churches completed in 1974